Wilmshurst may refer to:

 Elizabeth Wilmshurst (b. 1948), a former legal adviser to the UK government
 Ken Wilmshurst (1931–1992), English athlete
 Rea Wilmshurst (1941–1996), editor of  Lucy Maud Montgomery's short stories
 Walter Leslie Wilmshurst (1867–1939), Freemason
 George Cecil Wilmshurst (1873/1874–1930) - British painter and illustrator, active 1897-1917